Reckless is a 2014 Dutch thriller film directed by Joram Lürsen. The film is a Dutch-language remake of the 2009 film The Disappearance of Alice Creed. The film was the opening film of the Netherlands Film Festival in 2014.

In 2015, Tygo Gernandt won the Rembrandt Award for his role in the film.

The soundtrack for the film was made by the Dutch band Kensington.

Plot 
Two ex-convicts, Victor (Tygo Gernandt) and Rico (Marwan Kenzari) kidnap a millionaire's daughter, Laura Temming (Sarah Chronis). They force her into a van in broad daylight and soon after begin negotiating ransom with her father. They remove all evidence by stripping their van, removing all of Laura's clothes and preventing her from sitting on a toilet, intead forcing her to use a bedpan for peeing while handcuffed and ballgagged. The kidnapper's plan do not unfold when Laura manages to grab a gun when pretending to use the bucket to poop.

Cast
 Tygo Gernandt as Victor
 Marwan Kenzari as Rico
 Sarah Chronis as Laura Temming

Production 
Filming took place in the Dutch town of Oudewater.

References

External links 
 

2014 films
Dutch thriller films
2010s Dutch-language films
Dutch remakes of British films
Films shot in the Netherlands
Thriller film remakes